Bankia is a genus of ship-worms, marine bivalve molluscs of the family Teredinidae.

Species in the genus Bankia
 Bankia australis (Calman, 1920)
 Bankia bipennata (Turton, 1819)    
 Bankia brevis (Deshayes, 1863)
 Bankia carinata (J. E. Gray, 1827) – carinate shipworm
 Bankia cieba Clench and Turner, 1946    
 Bankia destructa Clench and Turner, 1946    
 Bankia fimbriatula Moll and Roch, 1931 – fimbriate shipworm
 Bankia fosteri Clench and Turner, 1946    
 Bankia gouldi (Bartsch, 1908) – cupped shipworm, gould shipworm
 Bankia martensi (Stempell, 1899)  
 Bankia neztalia (Turner and McKoy, 1979)    
 Bankia setacea (Tryon, 1863) – feathery shipworm
 Bankia sibirica Roch, 1934    
 Bankia zeteki Bartsch, 1921

References
 
 Powell A. W. B., New Zealand Mollusca, William Collins Publishers Ltd, Auckland, New Zealand 1979 

Teredinidae
Bivalve genera
Taxa named by John Edward Gray